The 1895–96 United States collegiate men's ice hockey season was the 2nd season of play for collegiate ice hockey in the United States and the first scholastic year in which two organized college teams played against one another. 

Johns Hopkins University and Yale University competed in two February games, marking the beginning of collegiate ice hockey in the United States.

Regular season

Standings

References

External links
College Hockey Historical Archives
1895–96 NCAA Standings

 
College